David Ferrer defeated Tomáš Berdych in the final, 6−4, 7−5 to win the singles tennis title at the 2015 Qatar Open.

Rafael Nadal was the defending champion, but lost in the first round to Michael Berrer.

Novak Djokovic's loss to Ivo Karlovic in the quarterfinals would be his only loss prior to a tournament final in the 2015 season.

Seeds

Draw

Finals

Top half

Bottom half

Qualifying

Seeds

Qualifiers

Qualifying draw

First qualifier

Second qualifier

Third qualifier

Fourth qualifier

References
 Main Draw
 Qualifying Draw

Singles